The Alamos mud turtle (Kinosternon alamosae) is a species of mud turtle in the family Kinosternidae. It is endemic to Mexico, where it occurs in the states of Sinaloa and Sonora.

Description 
The Alamos mud turtles are slightly less than average in size compared to other members of the same genus. Males tend to be larger than females, with matured females having an average carapace length of 95–100 mm, compared to an average of 90–120 mm with their male counterparts. When males are compared to females, there are a few notable differences. Males have a much narrower carapace, a shorter plastron, a shorter plastral hind lobe, narrower plastral lobes, a shorter bridge, and a shorter interanal seam.

Habitat 
Alamos mud turtles prefer temporary pond habitats. Examples of such include arroyos, roadside ditches, and cattle tanks. The Alamos mud turtle also has an extraordinary thermal tolerance. Researchers have found them in shallow ponds (~10 cm deep) with temperatures reaching as high as 42 °C. Some specimen are even located in ponds that are scalding to the touch.

References

Further reading
Berry, J. F. and Legler, J. M. 1980. A new turtle (genus Kinosternon) from northwestern Mexico. Contributions in Science, Natural History Museum of Los Angeles County 325, 1–12.

Kinosternon
Endemic reptiles of Mexico
Natural history of Sinaloa
Natural history of Sonora
Reptiles described in 1980